Phyllocnistis cirrhophanes is a moth of the family Gracillariidae, known from Karnataka, India.

The hostplant for the species is Alseodaphne semecarpifolia. They mine the leaves of their host plant. The mine starts as a spiral. Later, it becomes an undulating gallery under the upper cuticle of the leaf, always confined to the edge of the leaf and producing blackish discolouration.

References

Phyllocnistis
Endemic fauna of India
Moths of Asia